Monumento del Llano Amarillo is a monument in the Spanish territory of Ceuta, in the North of Africa, at the bottom of Mount Hacho. The fifteen metre monument was moved here from Morocco in 1962 and it is one of the few sculptures left that record Spain's period of Nationalism following the Spanish Civil War.

History
The monument records an "oath before the battle" made by generals, led by General Yagüe, involved in the conspiracy that gave rise to the Spanish Civil War on 12 July 1936. The monument was designed by the sculptor Bonifacio López Torvizco and the architect was Francisco Martínez Hernanz. It was unveiled on 13 July 1940 in Llano Amarillo, near Issaguen, in the Spanish Protectorate of Morocco (now independent Morocco). The monument is a symbol of the eventual defeat of the republican forces. The main monolith is fifteen metres high with stylized wings. General Yague led his mutinous troops across the Straits of Gibraltar from Ceuta. He joined up with other soldiers near Seville. Yague is a controversial figure as he is known to have killed thousands including civilians and hospital patients to avoid taking prisoners.

The work was damaged by a five-person team financed by the Catalan banker and exile Josep Andreu Abelló. The team used paint to create the message "Amnesty and Freedom" which was a reference to Spanish political prisoners at that time.

In 1962 and as a result of the independence of Morocco the monument was moved to Ceuta. It was disassembled stone by stone in Morocco and it was then rebuilt at this location.

The monument is one of the few in Spain which commemorate the time when General Franco ruled Spain, and while it is still controversial there have been no recent attacks on the monument.

References

Buildings and structures in Ceuta
Francoist monuments and memorials in Spain
1940 in Morocco
1962 in Spain
1940 sculptures